Pak Tongjin (1916–2003) was a famous South Korean pansori musician.

References

External links
 Contains a discography for Pak Tongjin.

1916 births
2003 deaths
Pansori